Hanno Behrens (born 26 March 1990) is a German professional footballer who plays as a midfielder for Liga 1 club Persija Jakarta.

Career
Behrens began his career with Hamburger SV, breaking into the reserve team in 2008. The following year, he was promoted to the first team, but never made an appearance, continuing to play regularly for the reserves over the next three seasons.

In 2012, he moved to SV Darmstadt 98 and made his debut for the club in August of that year, as a substitute for Elton da Costa in a 3–1 defeat to Chemnitzer FC, in which he scored Darmstadt's only goal.

In July 2017, Behrens agreed to a contract extension with 1. FC Nürnberg. On 6 May 2018. he scored as Nürnberg won 2–0 against SV Sandhausen to clinch promotion to the Bundesliga.

In June 2021, Hansa Rostock announced the signing of Behrens on a free transfer for the 2021–22 season. He signed a one-year contract with an option.

In early July 2022, Indonesian top flight league club Persija announced the signing of Behrens for 2022–23 season. On 23 July 2022, He made his league debut by starting in a 0–1 loss against Bali United. Later that month, he scored his first goal after receiving a through pass from Syahrian Abimanyu in the 15th minute, in a 2–1 winning match against Persis at Patriot Candrabhaga Stadium.

Career statistics

References

External links
 
 

1990 births
Living people
Association football midfielders
German footballers
SV Darmstadt 98 players
Hamburger SV II players
1. FC Nürnberg players
FC Hansa Rostock players
Persija Jakarta players
Bundesliga players
2. Bundesliga players
3. Liga players
Liga 1 (Indonesia) players
People from Elmshorn
Footballers from Schleswig-Holstein
Expatriate footballers in Indonesia
German expatriate sportspeople in Indonesia
German expatriate footballers